Nabil Kochaji (born April 19, 1975) is a Syrian author, novelist, medical researcher and academic. His extensive work in research and subsequent interest in literature was aided by his multilingual skills as he is well versed in English, Arabic, Flemish, Spanish and German.

Education and career
Dr. Nabil started his career as a dentist after graduating in 1997 from the faculty of dentistry in the University of Damascus. Following that he pursued a masters in medical and pharmaceutical research from the Vrije Universitaite Brussels (VUB), Faculteit van de Geneeskude en Farmacie before finally achieving a PhD in Dental Sciences at the same University in 2005. He is currently a full professor at the faculty of Dentistry in the University of Damascus.
This academic year (2016-2017) he was assigned to the position of: Founding Dean, faculty of dentistry at Al-Sham Private University.

He was awarded Senior Robert-Frank award from the International Association for Dental research (IADR), 2005, Title of abstract: the Possible role of Myoepithelial Cells in Salivary Glands Pathogenesis and has since supervised eight master students and one doctorate in the same research line.

In September 2017, he was the first ever to describe the "Peri-Implant Cyst" in his article: Inflammatory odontogenic cyst on an osseointegrated implant: A peri-implant cyst? New entity proposed, published in Dental and Medical Problems 54(3):303-306.

Medical publications
In the medical research field Dr. Kochaji has several titles to his name:

 Contemporary Oral Medicine: A Comprehensive Approach to Clinical Practice (co-author) 2018
 Swine Flu Vaccination (in Arabic) 2010
 Problem Facing Dentists During their Practice (three volumes, in Arabic) 2009
 Part 1: Muscoskeletal Disorders
 Part 2: Infection Control
 Part 3: Dental Office environment effects 
 Maintaining Oral hygiene of Cancer patient (in Arabic) 2009
 Swine Flu (in Arabic) 2009
 Oral Pathology for practicing dentists (series with several authors, in Arabic)
 Volume 1: Oral Mucosa Lesions
 Part 1:   White lesions (April 2007)
 Part 2: Red Lesions (Augustus 2007)
 Part 3: Ulcerative lesions (Augustus 2007)
 Part 4: Lymphatic lesions (Augustus 2007)
 Part 5: Vesicolobullous lesions (September 2007)
 Part 6: Verrocous lesions (February 2008)
 Part 7: Pigmented lesions (March 2008)
 Odontogenic Cysts, Clinical Complication & Potential Neoplastic Transformation. Thesis submitted to obtain the title Doctor of Philosophy in Dental Science (PhD), University of Brussels 2005 (in English –translated and published in Arabic 2009).
 Expression of cell proliferating-associated nuclear antigen Ki67 in jaws cyst, Master thesis submitted to obtain the degree of master in medical and pharmaceutical research at the University of Brussels, Brussels, Belgium. June 2002 (in English).

Literary works

His first novel A Journey to Mars (Arabic Rehla ela al Mareekh رحلة الى المريخ )  was his first publication (five editions) and is available in dual language.
his second novel, this time a thrill I Know Who Killed Me  (Arabic Ana A`rifo Man Katalani أنا أعرف من قتلني) was published early 2016 (four editions)., in 2019 he published his third novel Silicon Valley  (Arabic wadi al-silicon وادي السيلكون)

Translations

Aside from his medical research, Dr. Kochaji has enriched the library of the Arab medical researcher by translating some key references. Notably, Ten Car's Oral Histology, Forensic Dental Evidence, second edition (Bilingual Book, English- Arabic),Cawson's  Essentials of Oral Pathology and Medicine, Forensic Dental Evidence all in co-publishing program with ELSEVIER publishers.

References

External links

 Official A Journey to Mars Facebook Page 
 Interview with Dr Kochaji in discussion of his novel.
 Video of a speech in the release of his Novel
  the full text of Prof. Kochaji's article that describes for the first time ever the "Peri_implant Cyst"

1975 births
Living people
Syrian medical researchers
Syrian male writers
Syrian novelists
Syrian dentists